Anibál Nieves Javier (born November 11, 1965) is retired male sport wrestler from Puerto Rico. 

In college, he wrestled for East Stroudsburg University, where he achieved All-American status at the Division I level of the NCAA. He twice represented his native country at the Summer Olympics: in 1992 and 1996. Nieves also twice won a silver medal at the Pan American Games during his career. After coaching stints at Springfield Technical Community College (with both the men’s and women’s programs), American International College, Western New England University, he was hired as the head men’s and women’s coach at East Stroudsburg University. He was a nine-time Puerto Rican champion.

References

 
 New England website

External links
 

1965 births
Living people
Wrestlers at the 1992 Summer Olympics
Wrestlers at the 1996 Summer Olympics
Puerto Rican male sport wrestlers
Olympic wrestlers of Puerto Rico
Western New England University
American sportsmen
Pan American Games silver medalists for Puerto Rico
Pan American Games medalists in wrestling
Wrestlers at the 1991 Pan American Games
Wrestlers at the 1995 Pan American Games
Medalists at the 1991 Pan American Games
Medalists at the 1995 Pan American Games